Rosenthal-Bielatal is a municipality in the Sächsische Schweiz-Osterzgebirge district, in Saxony, Germany.

References

Populated places in Saxon Switzerland